The Myanmar Royal Dragon Army (MRDA), also known as Myanmar's Royal Dragon Army, is an armed resistance organisation based in Pale Township, Sagaing Region. It was founded on 1 January 2022 by its leader, Bo Nagar, and is under the command of the National Unity Government.

History 
In February 2022, the MRDA announced it had attacked two bases near the villages of Ziphyugone and Einmahti alongside another resistance groups. The MRDA claimed that around 40 government troops and Pyusawhti militia members had been killed.

In late April 2022, the MRDA attacked a number of outposts in Pale held by the Tatmadaw and Pyusawhti, a pro-junta militia. The MRDA also ambushed junta forces which it claimed were raiding villages and burning civilian homes.

References

2021 establishments in Myanmar
Military units and formations established in 2021
Paramilitary organisations based in Myanmar
Rebel groups in Myanmar